Longue paume, or jeu de longue paume, is an outdoor version of jeu de paume, an ancestor of modern lawn tennis.  Hundreds of years ago it was quite popular, particularly in France. It is a game of gain-ground as Balle à la main.

It was part of the Paris 1900 Summer Olympics, but its medal status is disputed. Today, the sport is most played in the region of Picardy.  The governing body of the sport is the Fédération Française de Longue Paume, with its headquarters in Amiens.

Others games of gain-ground 
 Ballon au poing
 Balle à la main
 Real tennis
 Balle pelote
 Balle au tamis
 Llargues

See also 

 Handball International Championships
 International game

External links

 Connaissez-vous la Longue Paume?

 
Games of gain-ground
Ball games
Team sports
Former Summer Olympic sports
Forms of tennis
Sports originating in France